The HMS Group is a diversified machine-building and engineering holding company, a manufacturer of pumps, compressors, and oil & gas equipment which production and engineering assets are located in Russia and abroad.

The company's headquarters are located in Moscow, Russia.

Main business activities
Engineering, manufacturing, and complex procurement of the following products:
 Pumps, pumping systems, and pumping stations
 Compressors, gas compression systems, and compressor stations
 Skid-mounted and modular oil & gas field equipment

Company structure
HMS Group is a joint-stock company established and operated in accordance with the legislation of the Russian Federation with subordinate enterprises located in Russia and Belarus. 
 HMS Group structure:
 Industrial pumps division
 HMS Livgidromash, Russia
 Livnynasos, Russia
 Promburvod, Belarus
 Bobruisk Machine Building Plant, Belarus
 Hydromashservice (integrated commercial company of HMS Group), Russia
 Dimitrovgradhimmash, Russia
 Nizhnevartovskremservice, Russia
 Oil & gas equipment and solutions business unit
 HMS Neftemash, Russia
 Sibneftemash, Russia
 Sibnefteavtomatika, Russia
 Giprotyumenneftegaz, Russia
 HMS Compressors business unit
 Kazancompressormash, Russia
 NIIturbokompressor, Russia
 Tomskgazstroy, Russia

HMS Group is a member of the Russian Union of Industrialists and Entrepreneurs (RSPP), the Russian Engineering Union, the Russian Pump Manufacturers Association, the Union of Oil and Gas Equipment Producers, the New Gas Industry Technology Association of Equipment Manufacturers.

Company history
Hydromashservice, the bedrock of HMS Group, was founded in 1993. The main business was focused on supply pumps and systems to CIS countries (Ukraine, Belarus, Moldova, and Kyrgyzstan) and Russia.

By 1995 Hydromashservice had expanded and entered CIS markets and soon become one of the leaders specializing in the supplying pumps and systems for oil & gas, power, water and utilities.

Since 2003 Hydromashservice has been growing by organic growth coupled with active merging and acquiring pump and oilfield skid mounted equipment manufacturers, R&D and engineering companies as well as servicing and EPC companies:
 2003 – Livgidromash (since 07.07.2014 – HMS Livgidromash) joined the Group
 2004 – Acquisition of HMS Neftemash (before 26.08.2010 – Neftemash)
 2006 – Nizhnevartovskremservice was acquired
 2007 – Takeover of Tomskgazstroy, Dimitrovgradhimmash
 2008 – Promburvod (Minsk, Belarus)
 2009 – Sibnefteavtomatika was acquired
 2010 – Giprotyumenneftegaz became part of the Group 
 2011 – Sibneftemash, joined the Group and Bobruysk Machine Building Plant,
 2012 – Kazancompressormash, Russian compressor manufacturer,
 2013 – NIIturbokompressor was acquired

In February 2011 HMS Group completed an initial public offering of global depositary receipts (GDRs) on the London Stock Exchange, resulted in an aggregate gross proceeds of US$360 mn and a post-IPO equity value for the Company of US$967 mn.

References

Companies listed on the London Stock Exchange
Manufacturing companies established in 1993
1993 establishments in Russia
Manufacturing companies based in Moscow
Pump manufacturers
Russian brands